A gender reveal party is a party held during pregnancy to reveal the baby's sex to the expectant parents' family and friends, and sometimes to the parents themselves. Prenatal sex discernment technology furnishes the necessary information. The practice originated in the United States during the late 2000s.

It is distinct from, but sometimes combined with, a baby shower, where the primary activity is giving expecting parents gifts for their future child. The gender reveal party often involves gender stereotypes such as pink and blue denoting girls and boys, respectively.

The practice is controversial and has been criticized for the use of elaborate and dangerous special effects, which have directly contributed to multiple deaths, injuries and large-scale forest fires, namely the 2017 Sawmill Fire and the 2020 El Dorado Fire. The practice has also been criticized for reinforcing gender stereotypes, and binary gender essentialism.

History and development 
The gender reveal party developed in the late 2000s. An early example was recorded in the 2008 posts of then-pregnant Jenna Karvunidis on her ChicagoNow blog High Gloss and Sauce announcing the sex of her fetus via cake; she had previously had several miscarriages and wished to celebrate that her pregnancy had developed to the point that the sex of the fetus could be determined. YouTube videos can be found as early as 2008 and 2009, becoming significant around 2011, after which the trend continued to grow through the 2010s.

In 2019, Karvunidis observed an increase in extreme reveal events over the preceding five years, with parents "burning down forests and exploding cars, bringing alligators into the mix". She expressed regret at having helped start the trend, learning how the LGBT and intersex communities feel, and finally revealing the daughter they announced back in 2008 to be a gender-nonconforming individual who wears suits while still identifying as female. After the 2020 El Dorado Fire was started by a malfunctioning pyrotechnical device at a gender reveal party, Karvunidis pleaded for people to stop staging such events.

Comparison to baby showers 
Baby showers, a traditional prenatal celebration, have some key differences from gender reveal parties. Primarily, the focus on gender reveal parties is fetal sex, while baby showers focus on the giving of supplies and items for the future infant to expectant parents. Traditionally, baby showers are for women only, while gender reveal parties have no inherently-associated gender restriction and attendee limitations are determined by the pregnant individual or couple. Some couples combine the two.

Spread and mediatization 
The trend was popularized on social media platforms such as YouTube, Instagram, and Pinterest, although it originated before the latter two. This mediatization has significantly boosted the likelihood of expectant parents to have or take part in gender reveal parties. Internet remix culture lends the practice great receptivity toward individual creativity, a factor in their growing popularity. Demographic research shows the most gender reveal parties are done by expecting parents that are middle-class, heterosexual White Americans who are married or partnered.

Planning the event 
The focus of gender reveal parties being the fetal sex, such information is a prerequisite. This can be determined at or after the gestational age required by the method being used. For ultrasound, the most common method, the earliest this can be reliably done is approximately 65 days, but it is typically done at around 20 weeks. Both the determination of fetal sex and the party are typically held during the second trimester.

Post-examination knowledge of the fetal sex by the parents varies. Most commonly, a third party (sometimes called a "gender guardian") is entrusted with the information, and it remains a secret from the parents until the reveal. This person is responsible for making party arrangements to ensure the reveal happens without the prior knowledge of the parents. In other cases, it is already known to one or both parents, and the reveal is specifically for attendees.

To help maintain the mystery, party decorations are typically heavily gendered, but ambiguous when taken as a whole.

During the event 

While the focus remains on the fetal sex, the reveal is typically the climax of the party. Prior to the reveal, party games are common, in which attendees or expecting parents guess or assert the fetal sex. This can also take the form of competition between a "Team Pink" and "Team Blue" which parents or participants may join.

Sometimes the event includes features of a baby shower. If this is the case, gifts may be given or opened at a specific time.

The reveal 

Most reveal methods utilize gender-associated colors, most typically blue and pink representing male and female respectively, decorated with other gender-associated items. The method of reveal varies; common methods involve cutting special cakes, launching or popping balloons, confetti, streamers, piñatas, colored smoke, and Silly String. Other seasonally-related items such as Easter eggs, Jack-o'-lanterns, Christmas presents, or Fourth of July or New Year's fireworks may also be incorporated depending on time of pregnancy.

Once these colors are revealed, both the expecting parents and onlookers are made aware of the fetus's sex, typically to great celebration and comment by attendees. The announcement of a predetermined, sex-dependent baby name may also take place.

Criticism 
The sex and gender distinction underlies many criticisms of gender reveal parties. The term "gender reveal" is considered a misnomer by those who believe in a distinction. Gender is a social construct in this view, not definitively determined by biological characteristics, with an individual gender identity impossible to determine medically. Thus, when a reveal of a fetus's genitals is made, it is the sex and not the gender that is being revealed, according to this view.

Furthermore, gender reveal parties rely heavily on the male–female gender binary, which assumes the child will not be intersex, which occurs in an estimated 1 in 4,500–5,500 births. Gender reveal parties have been argued to reinforce gender essentialism, precluding and minimizing transgender identity. Some parents have rejected gender reveal events, in part because of conversations regarding gender identity and transgender issues becoming more common. 

Overall, the practice reinforces stereotypical gender roles, often utilizing polarizing gender dichotomies in party materials such as "Guns or Glitter", "Pistols or Pearls", or "Wheels or Heels". Critics say that there is no reason to assume a neat fit into the essentialist dichotomy even in the case of a cisgender, non-intersex child. In 2019, Jenna Karvunidis, considered one of the pioneers of gender reveal parties, called for re-evaluation of the practice due to how it might affect transgender and non-binary individuals, writing about her own daughter's gender nonconformity. After the El Dorado Fire in 2020, Karvunidis decried the parties and pleaded for people to stop having them.

The practice has also been criticised for sometimes involving dangerous stunts and animal abuse.

Incidents and injuries 
Some instances of attempted spectacular special effects at gender reveals have caused injury, death, and even large-scale damage:

 The 2017 Sawmill Fire in Arizona was caused by a gender reveal party that combined blue powder and Tannerite. Other dangerous stunts have involved fireworks and alligators. 
 In 2018, "gender reveal burnouts", in which cars emit billowing clouds of pink or blue smoke, became a popular fad in Australia. The Queensland Police Service warns that this practice is dangerous, and that a number of attempted "burnouts" have resulted in flaming vehicles and arrests.
 In September 2019, a plane crashed in Turkey, Texas, when a low-flying crop duster was attempting to drop 350 gallons of colored water for a reveal. The pilot was not injured and the passenger received minor injuries. 
 In October 2019, a woman was killed in Knoxville, Iowa, by flying shrapnel from the explosion of a homemade device meant to reveal her grandchild's gender. The device, made from a metal cylinder packed with gunpowder and colored baby powder, was intended to project a display vertically, but the tape covering its top caused it to instead explode in a manner similar to a pipe bomb. 
 In September 2020, a gender reveal pyrotechnic device started the El Dorado Fire near Yucaipa, California, destroying homes, prompting evacuations, burning thousands of acres, and causing the death of one firefighter.
 On February 21, 2021, the accidental explosion of an in-development gender reveal device in Liberty, New York, killed the father-to-be and injured his younger brother.
 On March 29, 2021, two people were killed when a plane crashed in the Caribbean Sea off the coast of Mexico while carrying a trailing sign that read "It's a girl!"
 On April 20, 2021, 80 pounds of Tannerite were detonated during a gender reveal party near Kingston, New Hampshire, causing mild to moderate damage to buildings surrounding the radius of the explosion.
On May 31, 2021, a gender reveal party near Fort McMurray, Alberta, burned half a hectare of forest after the shooting of an exploding target. The organizers were fined $600 under the province's Forest and Prairie Protection Act.
 On September 25, 2022, a couple in Mato Grosso, Brazil, dyed a waterfall blue as part of a gender reveal party. Mato Grosso's environmental protection authority has charged them with a violation of federal law.

Parties for transgender people 

Some families of transgender individuals host gender reveal parties for transgender family members who come out during these parties.

Notes

References

Further reading

 

Human pregnancy
Gender and society
American culture
Parties
Ceremonies
2008 introductions
2010s fads and trends